Jim Lea (November 6, 1932 –  March 27, 2010) was an American sprinter who competed in the 1956 Summer Olympics. Lea represented the US Air Force as a runner.

Lea competed in the 1955 Pan Am Games, where both Lea and Louis Jones beat the previous world records in the 400 meters, with Jones winning the race. Commentators credited these two record-breaking performances to the high altitude in Mexico City, where they competed.

Lea qualified for the Olympics at the Armed Forces track and field championship. Experts at the time considered Lea one of the best prospects for an olympic medal for the United States. Lea once again competed against Jones, and once again Jones won, breaking his own world record in the process. Despite this, both Jones and Lea did poorly in the 1956 Olympics and neither won a medal.

Lea struggled with nerves before competition, and reportedly panicked before every one of them. Before his Olympics competition, he suffered a nervous skin rash.

References

1932 births
2010 deaths
American male sprinters
Olympic track and field athletes of the United States
Athletes (track and field) at the 1956 Summer Olympics
Athletes (track and field) at the 1955 Pan American Games
Pan American Games gold medalists for the United States
Pan American Games medalists in athletics (track and field)
Place of birth missing
Place of death missing
Medalists at the 1955 Pan American Games